East Coast Road is a two-way road in Marine Parade, Singapore. As its name suggests, the road used to run along Singapore's southeastern coastline before extensive land reclamation shifted the coastline southwards. The road starts in the west as Mountbatten Road, then continues eastwards - after the Haig Road and Amber Road junction - as East Coast Road. Moving further eastwards, the road continues as Upper East Coast Road before making a turn northwards to continue as Bedok Road.

References

Roads in Singapore